Mohammadabad (also Romanized as Moḩammadābād) is a town in Sistan and Baluchestan Province, Iran.

References 

Populated places in Sistan and Baluchestan Province